Michael Curran may refer to:
 Michael D. Curran, member of the Illinois House of Representatives
 Michael J. Curran, Irish priest 
 Mike Curran (born 1944), American ice hockey goaltender